Agia Eirini (for Saint Irene) is a community in the municipal unit of Eleios-Pronnoi in the southeastern part of the island of Cephalonia, Greece. It is situated in an inland valley, at about 90 m elevation. It is 2 km south of Tzanata, 3 km southeast of Xenopoulo, 3 km north of Pastra and 4 km southwest of Poros.  It is located on the road connecting Poros with Argostoli.

Historical population

External links
GTP - Agia Eirini

See also

List of settlements in Cephalonia

References

Populated places in Cephalonia